The Bølling oscillation, also Bølling interstadial, was a cool temperate climatic interstadial between the glacial Oldest Dryas and Older Dryas stadials, between 14,700 and 14,100 BP, near to the end of the last glacial period. It is named after a peat sequence discovered at Bølling lake in central Jutland, Denmark.  It is used to describe a period of time in relation to Pollen zone Ib—in regions where the Older Dryas is not detected in climatological evidence, the Bølling–Allerød is considered a single interstadial period.

Dates 
The beginning of the Bølling is also the high-resolution date for the sharp temperature rise marking the end of the Oldest Dryas at 14,670 BP. Roberts (1998) uses 15,000. A range of 14,650–14,000 BP calibrated has been assigned to the Bølling layer of the excavation at Lake Neuchâtel, Switzerland, 1992–1993. The Oxygen isotope record from Greenland ice includes the Bølling warm peak between 14,600 and 14,100 BP. Most of the recent dates available fall within a few hundred years of these.

Flora 
Of the two periods, Bølling and Allerød, Bølling is the warmer and came on more suddenly. During it sea level rose about 35 m due to glacial melt. Ice uncovered large parts of north Europe and temperate forests covered Europe from 29 deg. to 41 deg. north latitude. After  some pioneer vegetation, such as Salix polaris and Dryas octopetala, hardwoods, such as Quercus, and softwoods, Betula and Pinus, spread northward for a brief few hundred years.

Fauna 
During this time late Pleistocene animals spread northward from refugia in the three peninsulas, Spain, Italy and the Balkans. Geneticists can identify the general location by studying degrees of consanguinity in the modern animals of Europe. The hunting camps of ancient humans remain a major source of faunal fossils.

Animals hunted by humans are predominantly the big-game mammals: reindeer, horse, saiga, antelope, bison, woolly mammoth and woolly rhinoceros. In the alpine regions ibex and chamois were hunted. Throughout the forest were red deer. Smaller animals, such as fox, wolf, hare and squirrel also appear. Salmon was fished. For more details, see also the references to fauna under Oldest Dryas and Older Dryas.

Human cultures 
Humans reentered the forests of Europe in search of big game, which they were beginning to hunt relentlessly, many to extinction. Their cultures were the last of the Late Upper Palaeolithic. Magdalenian hunters moved up the Loire into the Paris Basin. In the drainage basin of the Dordogne, the Perigordian prevailed. The Epigravettian dominated Italy. In the north, the Hamburgian, Creswellian and Federmesser cultures are found. In the Middle East, the pre-agricultural Natufian settled around the Eastern Mediterranean coast to exploit wild cereals, such as emmer and two-row barley. In the Allerød they would begin to domesticate these plants.

See also 
 Antarctic Cold Reversal
 Ice age
 Younger Dryas
 Bølling–Allerød warming

References

External links 
 Chronology of the Netherlands
 The Bølling–Allerød
 Sensitivity and rapidity of vegetational response to abrupt climate change
  Settlements of the Hamburgian and Federmesser Cultures

Pleistocene events
History of climate variability and change
Nordic Stone Age
Upper Paleolithic
Natufian culture